James Ley may refer to:

James Ley, 1st Earl of Marlborough (1552–1629), Lord Chief Justice of the King's Bench in Ireland and then in England; English MP and Lord High Treasurer
James Ley, 3rd Earl of Marlborough (1618–1665), British peer
James Ley (dramatist), Scottish playwright and screenwriter
James Ley (literary critic) (born 1971), Australian literary critic and essayist